Datuk Onn Hafiz bin Dato' Ghazi (born 2 March 1979) is a Malaysian politician who has served as the 19th Menteri Besar of Johor and Member of the Johor State Legislative Assembly (MLA) for Machap since March 2022. He previously served as MLA for Layang-Layang from May 2018 to March 2022. From March 2020 to his promotion to Menteri Besarship in March 2022, he served as Member of the Johor State Executive Council (EXCO) in the Barisan Nasional (BN) state administration under former Menteri Besar Hasni Mohammad.  He is a member of the United Malays National Organisation (UMNO), a component party of the ruling BN coalition.

Early life, family and education 
Onn Hafiz was born in Simpang Renggam, Kluang, Johor to Dato' Ghazi Ishak (1948-2021) and Datin Roquaiya Hanim Hussein (1950-2006), Hussein Onn's eldest child. He is the great-great-grandson of first and former Menteri Besar of Johor Jaafar Muhammad, great-grandson of seventh and former Menteri Besar of Johor cum founder, first and former President of UMNO Onn Jaafar, grandson of third and former Prime Minister of Malaysia Hussein Onn, and nephew of former Minister of Defence Hishammuddin Hussein. 

Onn Hafiz went to Royal Military College. He received Bachelor of Arts (BA) in Accounting from University of Hertfordshire.

Political career 
Onn Hafiz was the Exco of the UMNO Youth Movement in 2013-2018. In the 2018 election, he was chosen as the candidate for the Layang-Layang and won it with a small majority of only 364 against candidates from PKR and PAS. In the 2022 election, Onn Hafiz switched constituencies to Machap and won it with a majority of 6,543 against 3 candidates including a candidate from PEJUANG, Shahruddin Md Salleh.

On 15 March 2022, Onn Hafiz was officially sworn in as the new and 19th Menteri Besar of Johor, the 4th officeholder in just a single term of parliament of malaysia. Initially after the 2022 Johor state election, BN Chairman and UMNO President Ahmad Zahid Hamidi revealed that he would submit the name of his predecessor and caretaker menteri besar Hasni Mohammad to Sultan of Johor for  Hasni to be reappointed to the position after BN gained landslide victory in the election. BN previously also picked Hasni as its menteri besar candidate before BN returned to power. However a day before his appointment, Hasni suddenly announced his withdrawal from the running for the position and that he would pave way and endorse a younger candidate to lead the state government citing long term development for Johor and Onn Hafiz was instead appointed the next day.

Controversies and issues

1MDB Scandal
 
In April 2019, Onn Hafiz was a witness in former prime minister Najib Razak’s corruption trial, which involved millions of ringgit linked to state fund 1Malaysia Development Berhad (1MDB). He testified to the Kuala Lumpur High Court that his company Vital Spire received a cheque for RM240,000 from Najib to launch the Malaysian Digest portal.

Election results

Honours
  :
  Commander of the Order of the Territorial Crown (PMW) – Datuk (2018)

References

External links 
 Onn Hafiz Ghazi on Facebook
 Onn Hafiz Ghazi on Twitter

Living people
1979 births
People from Johor
Malaysian people of Malay descent
Malaysian Muslims
United Malays National Organisation politicians
21st-century Malaysian politicians
Members of the Johor State Legislative Assembly
Johor state executive councillors
Chief Ministers of Johor
Alumni of the University of Hertfordshire